Michael Che Campbell (born May 19, 1983) is an American stand-up comedian, actor, and writer. Che is best known for his work on the NBC sketch comedy series Saturday Night Live, where he has served as co-anchor on Weekend Update alongside Colin Jost, and the two were co-head writers from 2017 until 2022. Che and Jost co-hosted the 70th Primetime Emmy Awards in 2018.

Che was briefly a correspondent for The Daily Show with Jon Stewart and has previously worked as a writer for Saturday Night Live. At the end of September 2014, he became a Weekend Update co-anchor for the 40th season of Saturday Night Live alongside Colin Jost, replacing Cecily Strong.

Early life
Michael Che Campbell was born in Manhattan, New York City, New York, the youngest of seven children of Rose and Nathaniel Campbell. His father named Michael after the revolutionary Che Guevara.

Che was raised on the Lower East Side of Manhattan. He graduated from the Fiorello H. LaGuardia High School of Music & Art and Performing Arts.

Che worked in customer service for a Toyota car dealership for two years. He also created acrylic portraits of celebrities, printed the portraits on T-shirts, and sold them in SoHo. Tommy Hilfiger noticed his work and offered Che freelance work, but he did not turn in any designs.

Career

Beginnings and Saturday Night Live 
Che started performing stand-up comedy in 2009, regularly working several sets per night. In 2012, Che appeared on the Late Show with David Letterman. In 2013, Variety called Che one of "10 Comics to Watch", while Rolling Stone named him one of "The 50 Funniest People".

Che joined Saturday Night Live as a writer in 2013, at first as a guest writer and soon after as staff writer. On April 28, 2014, it was announced that Che would join The Daily Show in June as a correspondent. Che made his onscreen debut as a Daily Show correspondent on June 4. Although he appeared in only nine segments during his brief tenure on the show, he was lauded by TV Guide for his work. His signature piece for the Daily Show was "Race/Off: Live From Somewhere", a satirical commentary on the 2014 Ferguson protests. In this segment, Che "reported" from various locations (with frequent background changes accomplished via chroma key), looking for a place where a black man would not be harassed by police officers. The sketch ended with Che floating in outer space.

On September 11, 2014, it was announced that Che would take over Cecily Strong's position as a Weekend Update co-anchor for the 40th season of SNL, co-anchoring the segment with Colin Jost. Che is the first African-American co-anchor in the history of Weekend Update. During his first two seasons, Che primarily hosted Weekend Update and rarely appeared in any sketches. During his third season, Che was promoted to the main cast. In December 2017, Che was named co-head writer of Saturday Night Live. Vulture.com's Megh Wright complimented the Weekend Update joke-swapping segment where Che writes shockingly racist jokes for Jost to deliver. Che resigned as head writer ahead of the show's 48th season in 2022.

At a stand-up show on March 26, 2022, Che announced that he was leaving the desk after the current season, although he didn't state when or why he is leaving. After initially denying in an Instagram post he would leave, he later told Tony Dokoupil on the May 15, 2022 edition of CBS News Sunday Morning that he was uncertain about his future on SNL.

Other appearances 

In 2014, Che appeared in the movie Top Five, appearing as one of Chris Rock's character's friends.

On September 17, 2018, Che co-hosted the Emmy Awards with Colin Jost. Che and Jost also appeared on the March 4, 2019, episode of WWE's Monday Night Raw, where both were announced as special correspondents for WrestleMania 35. The pair got involved in a storyline with wrestler Braun Strowman, which eventually resulted in Che and Jost becoming participants in the André the Giant Memorial Battle Royal at WrestleMania.

Che has also appeared as a special guest on several episodes of the podcast "The Roundtable of Gentlemen".

Filmography

Film

Television

Awards and honors

References

External links

 
 

1983 births
Living people
People from the Lower East Side
Screenwriters from New York (state)
Writers from Manhattan
American male comedians
American male comedy actors
American male film actors
American male television actors
American male television writers
American television writers
American comedy writers
American stand-up comedians
American sketch comedians
African-American stand-up comedians
African-American male comedians
African-American male writers
African-American screenwriters
Fiorello H. LaGuardia High School alumni
21st-century American comedians
21st-century American screenwriters
21st-century American male writers
21st-century African-American writers
20th-century African-American people